Cry Wilderness is a 1987 family adventure film directed by Jay Schlossberg-Cohen.

Plot
Bigfoot (running away from those trying to kill him) befriends a young Californian boy named Paul whose park ranger father is tracking an escaped tiger.

Cast

Eric Foster as Paul Cooper
Maurice Grandmaison as Will Cooper
Griffin Casey as Morgan
John Tallman as Jim
Faith Clift as Dr. Helen Foster

Production
Cry Wilderness was written by Philip Yordan with an estimated 100 writing credits in film since the 1940s, including 1945's Dillinger, the 1955 film noir classic The Big Combo, the 1962 film adaptation of The Day of the Triffids, and the 1964 Anthony Mann epic The Fall of the Roman Empire. In 1986, Yordan was hired by production company Visto International to make a Bigfoot movie, with the company having previously made a Sasquatch movie in 1978 that made a $4 million profit on a $150,000 budget. Writing the script became difficult for Yordan as he was told to cut out horror scenes and be restricted from adding any violence, profanity, or sex. These restrictions resulted in the script writer telling the distributor he would be writing a movie about nothing, to which the distributor acknowledged that is what they wanted.

Location shooting occurred at Balboa Park in San Diego, Mono Lake in  Mono County, California and Devils Postpile National Monument in Madera County, California. The museum scene in the film was shot in the Children's Museum of Utah.

Reception
The 1988 edition of The Motion Picture Guide gave the film zero stars, describing it as "an inane and poorly made feature", criticizing its acting  while Eric Harwood for Variety called it one of the worst movies ever made. Dave DeNaui for The Bellingham Herald panned the film for its acting, story and dialogue, declaring the flim to be "the worst film in five decades".

Home media
The film was re-released on DVD in 2014 by Vinegar Syndrome alongside the 1970s documentary film In Search of Bigfoot.

Mystery Science Theater 3000
In 2017, the film was the subject of parody by Mystery Science Theater 3000, as the second episode of Season eleven. Emily St. James for Vox considered the movie to be so preposterous it didn't need to be riffed. Paste's Jim Vorel ranked it as the second best episode of season eleven, behind Wizards of the Lost Kingdom.

See also
 Harry and the Hendersons
 List of films considered the worst
 Coca-Cola-featured prominently in the film

References

Citations

Bibliography

External links
 
 
 TV spots on YouTube

1987 films
Bigfoot films
American fantasy adventure films
Films shot in California
American independent films
Mono County, California
Rediscovered American films
1980s rediscovered films
1980s English-language films
1980s American films